Camden County Technical Schools Pennsauken Campus, also known as Pennsauken Tech, originally Camden County Vocational School, is a four-year regional vocational-technical public high school located in Pennsauken Township, in Camden County, New Jersey, United States, that serves students in ninth through twelfth grades from across Camden County as part of the Camden County Technical Schools. The schools main building opened in 1928 at a time when most county resident lived near Camden and was the district's only campus until the Camden County Technical Schools Gloucester Township Campus opened in 1969 to serve more rural, eastern portions of the county. In 2011, the campus opened the Science and Horticultural Center building to act as a multiple-classroom extension unit. Etched high-up into a portion of the front face of the school's main building is "He who hath a trade, hath an estate," a quote from Benjamin Franklin.

As of the 2021–22 school year, the school had an enrollment of 763 students and 66.3 classroom teachers (on an FTE basis), for a student–teacher ratio of 11.5:1. There were 460 students (60.3% of enrollment) eligible for free lunch and 77 (10.1% of students) eligible for reduced-cost lunch.

Awards and recognition
Named one of the 100 Best High Schools in the United States in 2004 and 2005 by U.S. News & World Report.
Title 1 Distinguished School of Excellence by the United States Department of Education, the only high school in the state to receive the honor in 2012.
Bronze Medal from U.S. News & World Report in 2012 and 2013.
Named a New Jersey School of Character 2013, one of three high schools statewide to receive this honor.

Athletics
The Pennsauken Tech Tornadoes compete in the Olympic Conference, an athletic conference consisting of public and private high schools located in Burlington County, Camden County and Gloucester County. Sister school and archrival, Camden County Tech Warriors also competes in the Olympic Conference. The Olympic Conference operates under the aegis of the New Jersey State Interscholastic Athletic Association (NJSIAA). With 611 students in grades 10-12, the school was classified by the NJSIAA for the 2019–20 school year as Group II for most athletic competition purposes, which included schools with an enrollment of 486 to 758 students in that grade range. The school mascot is the Tornado.

School colors are maroon, white and gray. Interscholastic athletics include boys'/girls' cross country, baseball, bowling, boys'/girls' basketball, softball and boys'/girls' volleyball.

The boys' baseball team won the NJVTAC state championship in back-to-back years, in 1997 and 1998.

Career programs 
 Accounting & Finance
 Allied Health/Medical Services
 Automotive
 Business Technology
 Carpentry
 Computer Science & Information Technology
 Culinary Arts
 Digital Media Communications
 Environmental Studies
 Graphic Arts & Design
 Law & Public Safety
 Legal Assistant
 Pre-Engineering
 Senior Option & Independent Study
 Welding

Activities
21st Century After-School Program
FBLA
SkillsUSA
FFA
Health Occupations Students of America (HOSA)
National Honor Society
Journalism Club
Yearbook Club
Student Council
Newspaper
Interact Club
National Technical Honor Society
Practical Politics
Performing Arts
SADD
Renaissance
Gay-Straight Alliance

Administration
The school's principal is Dr. John Hourani.

References

External links
School website
Camden County Technical Schools website

Pennsauken Technical High School, National Center for Education Statistics

Pennsauken Township, New Jersey
Public high schools in Camden County, New Jersey
Vocational schools in New Jersey